is a Japanese professional golfer.

Ebihara was born in Abiko, Chiba, Japan. He won one tournament on the Japan Golf Tour and had career earnings of over ¥260 million.

Ebihara joined the European Seniors Tour in 2000 and has won six tournaments on it. In 2002 he topped the Order of Merit. He played in the UBS Cup in 2002.

Professional wins (18)

Japan Golf Tour wins (1)

Japan Golf Tour playoff record (0–1)

Other wins (4)
1982 Chiba Open
1984 Shinhan Donghae Open
1991 Sanko Grand Summer Championship

European Senior Tour wins (6)

European Senior Tour playoff record (1–1)

Other senior wins (7)
2000 Castle Hill Open
2001 N.Cup Senior Open
2002 PGA Philanthropy Big Rizak Senior Tournament
2006 Yonex Senior Open Okinawa
2007 Kyoei Sangyo Takanosu Senior Open
2010 Kanto Pro Grand Senior Championship
2013 Kanto Pro Grand Senior Championship

Team appearances
UBS Warburg Cup (representing the Rest of the World): 2002

References

External links

Japanese male golfers
Japan Golf Tour golfers
European Senior Tour golfers
People from Abiko, Chiba
Sportspeople from Chiba Prefecture
1949 births
Living people